Trying Times was a Canadian-American co-production anthology comedy television series produced by KCET, and aired on the PBS television network. The series lasted only two seasons, 1987 to 1989, but was the first original comedy on PBS. The series was co-produced with the Canadian Broadcasting Corporation, which aired the programs as part of a larger anthology series, Lies From Lotus Land.

Actors on the show included Rosanna Arquette, Candice Bergen, David Byrne, Jeff Daniels, Geena Davis, Teri Garr, Hope Lange, Catherine O'Hara, and Steven Wright. Scripts were written by Christopher Durang, Spaulding Gray, Bernard Slade, and Wendy Wasserstein.

The comedies are without laugh tracks, with the central character as narrator. The series looked for writers first, hoping their choices would attract cast. Writers were involved in casting, and on the set.

The series was filmed in Vancouver, to reduce costs. It was created and produced by Jon S. Denny.

Episodes

References

1987 American television series debuts
1989 American television series endings
PBS original programming
1980s anthology television series